The Serblias family was a Byzantine family that were active between the 11th and 13th centuries, employed in civil service in the central and provincial government. A part of the family was related to the Spanopouloi in the 1090s. The etymology of the name derives from their origin, either Serbia (Σερβλία), or the fortress town of Servia.

People
Members recorded in Byzantine Sigillography:
Peter, son of Serblias ( 1025–50).
Michael Serblias ( 1029), protospatharios of the Chrysotriklinos and krites of Thessaloniki; or krites of Boleron, Strymon and Thessaloniki.
Stephanos Serblias (1040/70), protospatharios and tax official (kommerkiarios) of Longibardia, possibly also mystographos.
Leon Serblias (1040/80), magistros. Constantine IX Monomachos' envoy to Iberia.
Peter Serblias ( 1050–75), magistros.
Nicholas Serblias ( 1060–62), krites of the Hippodrome and of the velon (1060); kensor and megas kourator of Tarsos and Seleukeia ( 1060–62); hypatos, krites of the Hippodrome, of the velon, of Boleron, Strymon and Thessalonica (August 1062).
John Serblias ( 1066–early 12th century), two seals with that name without titles, possibly two persons.
John Serblias ( 1066–beginning of 12th century), deputy of inspection.
Michael Serblias ( 1066–beginning of 12th century), no title.
Anthimos Serblias (unknown), krites.
Nikephoros Serblias ( 1100–1166), krites.
John Serblias (1106), imperial notarios of the genikon. Possibly the homonymous deputy of inspection.
Nikephoros Serblias (1140), mystikos. Possibly the homonymous krites.
[Anonymous] Serblias (1146), krites. The period suggests a possible identity with Nikephoros Serblias the mystikos or the krites.
Basil Serblias (1143–80), no title. A close relative of John.
John Serblias (1143–80), no title.
Nikephoros Serblias (2nd half of 12th century), no title.
George Serblias (1200–1266), praitor of Thrace and Macedonia.

References

Sources

Byzantine families
11th-century Byzantine people
12th-century Byzantine people
13th-century Byzantine people